Viareggio Diga Foranea Lighthouse is an active lighthouse, located at halfway the breakwater of the dock of Viareggio on the Ligurian Sea.

Description
On the south side of the tower are seven windows lined up in order to light the internal stairs, another window is that of the clock room.

The lighthouse is completely automated and managed by the Marina Militare with the identification code number 1868 E.F.

See also
 List of lighthouses in Italy

References

External links
 Servizio Fari Marina Militare

Lighthouses in Italy
Buildings and structures in Tuscany
Lighthouses in Tuscany